George Grueb (1835 - September 26, 1893) was an American soldier who fought in the American Civil War. Grueb received his country's highest award for bravery during combat, the Medal of Honor. Grueb's medal was won for his capturing a flag at the Battle of Chaffin's Farm, Virginia on September 29, 1864. He was honored with the award on April 6, 1865.

Grueb was born in Württemberg, Germany. He joined the Army from Brooklyn in August 1862, and mustered out with his regiment in June 1865. He was buried in Bath National Cemetery in Bath, New York.

Medal of Honor citation

See also
List of American Civil War Medal of Honor recipients: G–L

References

1835 births
1893 deaths
American Civil War recipients of the Medal of Honor
Burials in New York (state)
German-born Medal of Honor recipients
Württemberger emigrants to the United States
People of New York (state) in the American Civil War
People from Brooklyn
People from the Kingdom of Württemberg
Union Army soldiers
United States Army Medal of Honor recipients